Jadson Alves dos Santos (born 30 August 1993), simply known as Jadson, is a Brazilian footballer who plays as defensive midfielder for Juventude.

Career statistics

Honours
 Botafogo
 Taça Guanabara: 2013
 Taça Rio: 2013
 Campeonato Carioca: 2013

References

1993 births
Living people
Brazilian footballers
Brazil youth international footballers
Brazilian expatriate footballers
Campeonato Brasileiro Série A players
Campeonato Brasileiro Série B players
Botafogo de Futebol e Regatas players
Udinese Calcio players
Club Athletico Paranaense players
Expatriate footballers in Italy
Association football midfielders
Santa Cruz Futebol Clube players
Associação Atlética Ponte Preta players
Fluminense FC players
Cruzeiro Esporte Clube players
Esporte Clube Bahia players
Esporte Clube Juventude players
People from São Bernardo do Campo
Footballers from São Paulo (state)